is a Japan-only video game release for the Sega Saturn and Sony PlayStation. It is a cinematic text adventure in which players assume the role of a city detective who must solve the bizarre murders of women in the area that may be linked to the existence of intelligent alien life on Earth. The game used live English actors for the characters and still photos to visually tell the story. The story was written by Akio Aska while the movie parts were directed by Brian Yuzna.

References

External links

1997 video games
Adventure games
Full motion video based games
Interactive movie video games
Japan-exclusive video games
PlayStation (console) games
Sega Saturn games
Video games about police officers
Video games developed in Japan